James Howard Jarvis II (February 28, 1937 – June 6, 2007) was an American attorney and jurist who served as a United States district judge of the United States District Court for the Eastern District of Tennessee.

Early life and education

Born in Knoxville, Tennessee, Jarvis received a Bachelor of Arts degree from the University of Tennessee in 1958, where he was a member of Sigma Chi Fraternity; he was awarded the Significant Sig Award in 1997 for "achievement in a brother’s professional career and civic endeavors". He received a Juris Doctor from the University of Tennessee College of Law in 1960.

Career 
He was in private practice in Knoxville from 1960 to 1968. He was in private practice in Maryville, Tennessee from 1968 to 1972. He was a judge on the Law and Equity Court, Blount County, Tennessee from 1972 to 1977. He was a judge on the 30th Judicial Circuit Court, Blount County from 1977 to 1984.

Federal judicial service

Jarvis was nominated by President Ronald Reagan on September 6, 1984, to the United States District Court for the Eastern District of Tennessee, to a new seat created by 98 Stat. 333. He was confirmed by the United States Senate on October 11, 1984, and received his commission on October 12, 1984. He served as Chief Judge from 1991 to 1998. He assumed senior status on February 28, 2002. Jarvis served in that capacity until his death on June 6, 2007, in Knoxville.

References

Sources
 

1937 births
2007 deaths
Judges of the United States District Court for the Eastern District of Tennessee
United States district court judges appointed by Ronald Reagan
20th-century American judges
University of Tennessee alumni
University of Tennessee College of Law alumni